Arajuuri is a surname. Notable people with the surname include:

See Finnish 4th Division (Winter War) for J. Arajuuri, Finnish commander in the Winter War
Paulus Arajuuri (born 1988), Finnish footballer

Finnish-language surnames